Sidney Terris (September 7, 1904 – December 30, 1974) was a top rated American lightweight boxing contender from the lower East Side of Manhattan.  He excelled as an amateur, winning fifty straight bouts and taking Metropolitan, New York State, National AAU, and both National and International titles.

At the end of 1924, Tex Rickard, Dempsey's manager, rated Terris second behind only champion Benny Leonard. A world ranked lightweight from February 1925 until November 1929, his highest ranking was # 1. On February 6, 1925, he lost to Sammy Mandell in an elimination bout for the World Lightweight Championship.

Early life
Terris was born one of five children on September 27, 1904 on Clinton Street in the lower East Side of Manhattan to Fred and Gussie Terris.  His father died when he was only eight, leaving his single mother to bring up the large family. An early coach, Dan Caplin recognized his skilled footwork, and had Terris learning to box by age thirteen.  Boxing as an amateur, Terris was a prodigy from an early age, winning fifty bouts in a row, and accumulating titles that included the Metropolitan Amateur, New York State Amateur, and both National and International Amateur titles.

Early boxing career
Terris turned pro in 1922 at the age of eighteen, winning eighteen of nineteen fights that year.  Author Ken Blady noted that Terris's greatest strength, his early speed and constant footwork in the ring, could also be a detriment against more skilled opponents, as it exhausted him and made him less a threat near the end of his fights.

In his first years as a pro, and not yet nineteen, Terris beat exceptional boxer Eddie "Kid" Wagner in a ten-round points decision at the Henderson Bowl in Brooklyn on June 3, 1924 after a previous six round loss.

Terris had a few exceptional wins by knockout as a young pro. He was the first boxer to get a full count from Andy Chaney winning in a third-round knockout at the Henderson Bowl in Brooklyn on May 23, 1924, as well as winning with a seventh-round knockout of Johnny Lisse on January 21, 1924 at the Lenox Athletic Club in New York. Chaney, in over 130 fights, had never been knocked out. Impressively, Terris fought Sammy Mandell, 1926-30 Lightweight Boxing Champion, to a ten-round draw at Madison Square Garden on December 17, 1923.  One source noted that Terris's greatest bout in 1924, was a decisive win against French born Jewish boxing great Benny Valgar, in a ten-round decision at the Nostrand Athletic Club in Brooklyn.

Boxing peak and mid-career

Boxing author Ken Blady believes Terris's best year as a boxer was 1925, when he lost only one of his eighteen major bouts. Unfortunately the loss was in a sanctioned twelve round World Lightweight elimination contest with future reigning Lightweight champion Sammy Mandell on February 6, 1925 in Madison Square Garden. This exceptional bout drew 13,000 fans.  It was, in many ways a very close contest. Terris knocked Mandell to the mat for a nine count in the third round with a strong blow.  Mandell, however, evaded Terris for the remaining rounds, and with greater energy and speed, somehow won the bout on points by unanimous decision.

His wins over Jimmy Goodrich in January and Pal Moran in March 1925, helped keep him highly rated in his division.

From 1925 to 1927, Terris had an exceptional run and defeated boxing greats Jack Bernstein and Johnny Dundee twice each. Dundee was formerly both Jr. Lightweight and Featherweight World Champion. Bernstein held the Jr. Lightweight championship as late as June 20, 1924. Terris won every round in his victory over Dundee on May 4, 1925 in Madison Square Garden. His July 10, 1925 victory over Ace Hudkins was also impressive, showing an exceptional defense.

Temporary boxing retirement and slow decline
Perhaps because Terris went into temporary retirement in 1926 for eight months, his chances at a second title shot began to slowly diminish.  Taking up boxing again in 1927, he beat Billy Wallace, and followed with victories over Babe Herman, boxing great Ruby Goldstein, and Phil McGraw.  For some reason, his managers were unable to again secure a Lightweight Title shot.  At only 23 in early 1928, Terris was the victim of knockouts from the great Jimmy McLarnin, Ray Miller, and on January 28, 1929 from Babe Herman, speeding the end of his career. According to boxing writer Bert Sugar, even in his devastating first round loss to McLarnin on February 24, 1928 in Madison Square Garden, Terris was still getting in jabs and "boxing beautifully" shortly before being knocked to the canvas for the count.

Terris, defeated Phil McGraw on August 24, 1927, showing incredible pluck. The Sarasota Herald-Tribune, wrote "Sid Terris, New York contender for the lightweight championship won a decision from Phil McGraw of Detroit in their ten round contest at Ebbets Field, Brooklyn, tonight." He somehow performed this feat after "a sensational first round in which he was knocked down three times, once for the count of nine."

As early as 1928, the Milwaukee Journal, wrote that "It begins to look as though Sid Terris, once regarded as the uncrowned Lightweight Champion of the World, has reached the end of his fistic string." The article lamented his one-round knockout from Ray Miller of Chicago on July 6, 1928 in Coney Island.  But more tellingly, the article went on to note, "the Ghetto Ghost (Terris) was one of the fastest and cleverest lightweights. He fought the best there was in the division and lost few decisions."  The article also noted that in Terris's only lightweight title fight that "Mandell eked out a hairline decision at a great 15 round match at New York." It also noted Terris's stunning amateur record of winning "fifty straight bouts."

Retirement from boxing and later life
Terris continued to fight after his devastating first round loss to Jimmy McLarnin on February 24, 1928 at Madison Square Garden, but the quality of his competition faded, as did the size of his audience.  He lost as many as half of his contests from 1928 through his last bout with Johnny Gaito on May 7, 1931 in Columbus Hall in Yonkers.

In retirement in 1931, Terris worked many years as a maître d' at Stampler's Restaurant in Manhattan. He retired to Miami Beach with his family and died on December 30, 1974.

He was posthumously inducted into the International Boxing Hall of Fame in 2018 as the inductee in the Early Era division (1893-1943).

Professional boxing record
All information in this section is derived from BoxRec, unless otherwise stated.

Official record

All newspaper decisions are officially regarded as “no decision” bouts and are not counted in the win/loss/draw column.

Unofficial record

Record with the inclusion of newspaper decisions in the win/loss/draw column.

See also
List of select Jewish boxers

References

External links
Boxrec bio
Jews in Sports bio

1904 births
1974 deaths
Boxers from New York City
Jewish American boxers
Jewish boxers
Lightweight boxers
American male boxers
International Boxing Hall of Fame inductees
20th-century American Jews